Woodley Island is an island located in Humboldt Bay in the city of Eureka, California. The Table Bluff Lighthouse was moved to the island in 1987. There is also a marina on the island. The island is accessible by boat and car and is located across from downtown Eureka.

References 

Islands of Northern California